Aunt Bill is a 1916 American silent comedy film featuring Oliver Hardy.

Cast
 Oliver Hardy as Plump (as Babe Hardy)
 Billy Ruge as Runt
 Ray Godfrey as Mrs. Runt
 Florence McLaughlin as Mrs. Plump (as Florence McLoughlin)
 Bert Tracy as Aunt
 Billy Bletcher as Bogus Aunt

See also
 List of American films of 1916
 Oliver Hardy filmography

External links

1916 films
American silent short films
Silent American comedy films
American black-and-white films
1916 comedy films
1916 short films
American comedy short films
1910s American films
1910s English-language films